Nico Meerholz (born 23 October 1959) is a South African badminton player. He competed in two events at the 1992 Summer Olympics.

References

1959 births
Living people
South African male badminton players
Olympic badminton players of South Africa
Badminton players at the 1992 Summer Olympics
Place of birth missing (living people)